Holidays in Eden is the sixth studio album by the British neo-progressive rock band Marillion, released in 1991. Recorded at Hook End Manor in Oxfordshire and Westside Studios in London, it was the band's second album with vocalist Steve Hogarth and the first completely written without previous lead singer Fish.

Partly due to producer Christopher Neil, many of the songs feature a mainstream pop rock sound as opposed to progressive rock of previous works, and Hogarth has described Holidays in Eden as "Marillion's 'pop'est album ever". It reached number 7 in the UK Albums Chart.

Background
Hogarth said in 2012:

Release
Holidays in Eden was released in Europe on 24 June 1991 by EMI Records on CD, LP and cassette. It peaked at number 7 in the UK, spending 7 weeks in the charts, and became Marillion's first studio album not to gain any sales certification. The album reached number 7 in the Netherlands and number 10 in Germany.

In the U.S., Holidays in Eden was issued on 25 February 1992 by the I.R.S. Records label on CD and cassette. The American edition featured two new tracks, "A Collection" and "How Can It Hurt", which were the B-sides of the original "No One Can" and "Cover My Eyes (Pain and Heaven)" singles, respectively. In addition, the track order was rearranged and the title for "No One Can" was lengthened by adding "… Take You Away from Me". Finally, slightly different cover art was used, featuring the original cover overlaid with the new "MAR" "ILL" "ION" logo and the album title in the middle left of the cover in a straight line, rather than the original circle around the moon at the centre top.

As part of a series of Marillion's first eight studio albums, EMI Records re-released Holidays in Eden on 23 February 1998 with 24-bit digital remastered sound and a second disc containing bonus tracks. A new 180g heavy weight vinyl pressing identical to the original 1991 edition was released in 2012.

Three singles, "Cover My Eyes (Pain and Heaven)", "No One Can" and "Dry Land" were released, with the first preceding the album. "Cover My Eyes (Pain and Heaven)" was a re-write of Hogarth's earlier band How We Live's song "Simon's Car". "Dry Land" had previously been the title track of How We Live's only album released in 1987. Each of the three singles were minor hits in the UK attaining Top 40 spots.

At the Marillion Weekend 2011, the band performed the entire album with a slightly revised track order ("Waiting to Happen" moved to the fifth spot), the two additional tracks from the US CD and two unrelated songs as encores. This was released as part of the DVD/Blu-Ray set Holidays in Zélande, but also as a standalone CD Holidays in Eden 2011.

Cover art
As with the previous release, Seasons End, the cover art was designed by Bill Smith Studio using a monochromatic painting by illustrator Sarah Ball showing various stylised animals, a tree with a snake around it at the centre, and dominated by a darkish blue colour for the front cover. Holidays in Eden was Marillion's first album not to feature their original logo in any recognisable form, using the band name in a normal typeface instead.

Track listing

Tracks 6, 8-14 of the 1998 remastered edition bonus disc had previously been unreleased.

Personnel

Marillion
Steve Hogarth – vocals
Steve Rothery – guitar; photography (1998 remastered edition)
Mark Kelly – keyboards
Pete Trewavas – bass and backing vocals
Ian Mosley – drums and percussion

Technical personnel
Christopher Neil – production and backing vocals
Rob Eaton – recording and mixing
Ted Jensen – mastering (at Sterling Sound, New York)
Peter Mew – 1998 digital remastering (November 1997 at Abbey Road, London)
Bill Smith Studio – design
Sarah Ball – illustration
Paul Cox – photography

Charts

Weekly charts

Year-end charts

References
Notes

Citations

1991 albums
Albums produced by Christopher Neil
EMI Records albums
Marillion albums
Pop rock albums by British artists